Acampe rigida is a species of orchid native to the forests of tropical southern Asia where it grows on trees and rocks at altitudes of up to .

Description

The leaves are distichous. The apices of the leaves are obtuse and unequally bilobed. The petals are fleshy, and are yellow with purplish-brown stripes; they have a thick, white, three-lobed lower lip, and a short spur. They are followed by cylindrical or fusiform capsules.

Distribution and habitat
Acampe rigida is native to the Andaman Islands, Assam, Bangladesh, Bhutan, Cambodia, China, India, Laos, Malaysia, Myanmar, Nepal, the Philippines, Sri Lanka, Thailand and Vietnam. It occurs in forests, either growing epiphytically on the branches and trunks of trees, or growing on rocks, and often forming dense clumps.

Ecology
Acampe rigida is a deceptive orchid in that it produces a fragrance that may attract insects but does not then offer them any reward. It is self-compatible, but has not evolved any particular mechanism to enable self-pollination. In Guangxi province in southwestern China, it flowers in late August and September, at a time of year when rain falls almost daily and insect pollinators are scarce. In a research study, after many hours of observation, a single insect was observed to visit a flower, but pollination did not occur. Instead, the plant exhibited ombrophily; rain drops falling on the tips of the stamens knocked the caps off the anthers, and further drops caused the pollinia to be ejected upwards, after which strap-like stipes arrested their movement and caused them to land in the stigma cavity, resulting in self-pollination. A high rate of fruit set occurred, but without the action of the raindrops, self-pollination did not occur and fruit did not set.

References

External links
 
 

rigida
Orchids of Asia
Plants described in 1818